Oldorelino Nunes Leal, best known as Dorinho, (born in Santana do Livramento, Rio Grande do Sul, May 25, 1946) is a Brazilian former football (soccer) player.

Dorinho played for Internacional and Botafogo in the Campeonato Brasileiro.

Clubs
 Fluminense (RS): 1963
 Internacional: 1964 - 1974

Honours
 Campeonato Gaúcho: six times (1969, 1970, 1971, 1972, 1973 and 1974).

References

1946 births
Living people
Brazilian footballers
Association football midfielders
Sportspeople from Rio Grande do Sul
Sport Club Internacional players
Botafogo de Futebol e Regatas players